Rear Admiral Edward Joseph Barrett (born August 14, 1943) is a former flag officer in the United States Coast Guard, serving as chief of systems of the Coast Guard from 1966 to 1999. He is the grandfather of whistleblower and former NSA contractor Edward Snowden.

Early life
Barrett was born in the city of Poughkeepsie in the state of New York, United States on August 14, 1943. He graduated from the United States Coast Guard Academy in 1966.

Military career
Barrett completed Naval Flight training at NAS Pensacola Florida in 1968. 
In 1995, Barrett was inducted into the United States Coast Guard Academy hall of fame. He became a senior official with the FBI and was at the Pentagon during the September 11 attacks.

Systems and logistics
Admiral Barrett has testified before Congress several times in regards to narcotics, explosives, and ship scanning technology.

Family
Barrett is married to the former Anne Stokley of Wrightsville Beach, North Carolina. They have three daughters: Elizabeth Wendy Snowden, Jennifer Barrett, and Julie Barret. He is the former father-in-law of Chief Warrant Officer Lonnie Glenn Snowden, Jr., USCG (Ret).

References

Edward Snowden
United States Coast Guard admirals
Living people
1943 births